Ćoseti is a village in the municipality of Brčko, Bosnia and Herzegovina.

A small village just outside Čande and Maoča which are also in the Brcko District. The village during the 1992-1995 war was not hit as hard as the surrounding cities of Brčko District. New government funding has been requested in order to create better roads and support the new school that was built back in 2009. There are a few people that are from the United States that live there due to them coming to America during the warfare starting in 1992.

Demographics 
According to the 2013 census, its population was 732.

References

Villages in Brčko District